Lushui is a historic town located in the north of Chaling County, Hunan, China.

As a historic division of Chaling, Lushui Commune was created in 1961 from a part of Dongfeng Commune. The commune was reorganized as a township in 1984, then the township was reorganized as a town in 1992.

Lushui Town was dissolved on November 20, 2015, nine villages of the town were amalgamated to Yaolu Town, the other 3 villages were merged to Sicong Subdistrict.

Subdivisions
The town is divided into 12 villages and 1 community, the following areas: Lushui Community, Datai Village, Nongyuan Village, Shoutuan Village, Tiantu Village, Xiafang Village, Yuanwang Village, Dayuan Village, Shuangguan Village, Jieshi Village, Longxi Village, Miaoshi Village, and Miaoping Village.

References

Historic township-level divisions of Chaling County